Robert James Cassilly Jr. (November 9, 1949 – September 26, 2011) was an American sculptor, entrepreneur, and creative director based in St. Louis, Missouri. In 1997, Cassilly founded the idiosyncratic City Museum, which draws over 700,000 visitors a year and is one of the city's leading tourist attractions.

Early life and education

Cassilly was born in Webster Groves, Missouri, to a homemaker and a building contractor. He began skipping school by age 14 to work as an apprentice for a local sculptor, Rudolph Torrini. Cassilly graduated from Vianney High School, then earned a bachelor's degree in art from Fontbonne University in St. Louis.

Career
While at Fontbonne University, Cassilly met and married his first wife, painter and printmaker Cecelia Davidson. In May 1972, the couple honeymooned in Rome. They were visiting St. Peter's Basilica in Vatican City when Laszlo Toth attacked Michelangelo's The Pietà. Cassilly was the first to act and subdued Toth.

While living in St. Louis, Cassilly and Davidson restored over 36 dilapidated Victorian buildings. These restorations led to the construction of six in-fill townhouses, for which he designed the architectural flourishes. The Manhattan Townhouses, located at 4343 Laclede (1984) and 11-23 North Boyle (1985) in the City's Central West End, feature terracotta adorned with turtles and griffins. He also designed a 12-foot-tall cast stone border fence for Cordage-Nivek's adaptive reuse of the former Dorris Motor Car building (4100 Laclede, 1985). The townhouse project led Cassilly to start making sculptures professionally. He soon became known for his public pieces that depict animals such as turtles and hippos. The couple also built and ran a restaurant in Lafayette Square.

Eventually, they sold the restaurant, which allowed them to move to Hawaii, where Cassilly carved wooden figures.

Cassilly reportedly grew tired of Hawaii and returned to his native St. Louis. There, he met sculptor Gail Soliwoda, whose works include the limestone monument at the Myron and Sonya Glassberg Family Conservation Area. Cassilly divorced Davidson and married Soliwoda.

Cassilly and Soliwoda became business partners. In 1993, they bought a  complex, which included the International Shoe Building, offices and a 10-story warehouse, for 69 cents per square foot. They renovated the site and opened it in 1997 as the City Museum, helping to spark a renovation boom in downtown St. Louis. The museum includes a shoelace factory, a fire truck, two airplanes, and a Ferris wheel on the roof. The Project for Public Spaces listed the museum among the "Great Public Spaces in the World" in 2005. In 2002, financial obligations forced Cassilly to begin charging visitors a fee to park at the museum. Cassilly hung a sign in the museum's parking lot reading, "Greedy Bob’s Parking Lot."

Cassilly's other works include hippopotamus statues installed at Hippo Playground in Manhattan's Riverside Park in 1993. In 1997, Cassilly also contributed hippo sculptures to Central Park's Safari Playground near W. 91 Street. He designed two turtles for Turtle Park in St. Louis. A giant concrete butterfly, called the Mysterious Monarch, was unveiled in Faust Park outside the Butterfly House, Missouri Botanical Garden in 1997 in Chesterfield, Missouri. Cassilly's giraffe statue, which stands at the entrance to the Dallas Zoo, is the tallest sculpture in Texas at 67½ feet tall. His works for the St. Louis Zoo include the Sea Lion Fountains and a 45-foot squid statue.

In 2000, Cassilly began work on Cementland, a repurposing of a former cement factory on a  site in north St. Louis.

In 2002, Cassilly and Soliwoda divorced.

Commissioned sculptures
 1987-1989 dinosaur for Planet Hollywood West-end in Dallas. "Big-Tex Rex" now resides in Amarillo, Texas, at the Big Texan Steak Ranch
 1987: Marlin Perkins bust at the St. Louis Zoo
 1991: Six lighted entry markers at the St. Louis Galleria
 1993: Hippo playground sculptures in Manhattan's Riverside Park
 1996: Turtle Park sculptures in St. Louis' Forest Park
 1997: Hippopotamus Park statues at Central Park's Safari Playground in Manhattan
 1997: Giraffe statue at the Dallas Zoo
 1998: Mysterious Monarch  and Lopatapillar  at Faust Park in Chesterfield, Missouri
 1999: Sea Lion Fountains at the St. Louis Zoo
 Dinosaur at Dallas Planet Hollywood
 Ruins at Roman Rapids ride, Busch Gardens Virginia
 Apple chairs, Webster Groves, Missouri
 1999: Musical Lion Benches, University City, Missouri

Death
On September 26, 2011, Cassilly died at Cementland. A police investigation found that he died of injuries after the bulldozer he was driving flipped down a hill. Some members of Cassilly's family contested the results of the investigation and hired an independent doctor to review the evidence. He concluded that Cassilly was beaten to death, but the St. Louis medical examiner dismissed his evidence and stood by the ruling of accidental death.

Cassily was survived by his third wife, Melissa Giovanna Cassilly, and their two children, Dylan and Robert III; and two children from his second marriage, Daisy and Max.

References

1949 births
2011 deaths
Sculptors from Missouri
Museum founders
Fontbonne University alumni
People from Webster Groves, Missouri
Accidental deaths in Missouri
Saint Louis Zoo people
20th-century philanthropists
Death conspiracy theories